Nikita Andreyevich Gorbunov  (born February 14, 1984) is a Turkmenistani football coach of Russian descent and a former player who played as a goalkeeper. He working as an goalkeeping coach for Şagadam FK from 2022.

Early life 
Nikita Gorbunov was born in Askhabad, Turkmen SSR in Russian family.

Club career 
In 2013 with FC Balkan he won the AFC-President´s Cup 2013 in Malaysia.

In 2015, he moved to FC Ahal. Since 2016 plays for FC Altyn Asyr.

The season of 2019 began in FC Merw. In the summer transfer window 2019 returned to Şagadam FK.

His last game was the 1–0 victory against FC Ahal on 22 December at 2021 Turkmenistan Cup final.

Imternational 
He was called  up to Turkmenistan national football team for the games in 2010 FIFA World Cup qualification (AFC).

Achievements 
FC Balkan
 AFC President's Cup: 2013

Şagadam FK
Turkmenistan Cup: 2021

References

External links 
 

Living people
1984 births
Turkmenistan footballers
Turkmenistan international footballers
Association football goalkeepers
Sportspeople from Ashgabat
FC Nisa Aşgabat players
FC Ahal players
Turkmenistan people of Russian descent
2019 AFC Asian Cup players